Hoof wall separation disease, (HWSD), is an autosomal recessive genetic hoof disease in horses.  Research is being carried out at, among others, UC Davis School of Veterinary Medicine in Davis in California. The disease has been found in Connemara ponies and was earlier referred to as Hoof Wall Separation Syndrome, HWSS.

Symptoms
The disease develops among foals from the age of one to six months and typically occurs during their first year of life. The frontal edge of the hoof cracks and splits. Pieces of hoof wall chip off in bits. This cracking, chipping and peeling may involve the whole of the dorsal hoof wall. The deficit means that when the hoof wall reaches the ground (and weightbearing load) the wall breaks away from above the level of the sole.  Thus the affected pony has to walk on the sole of the hoof with no support provided by the dorsal hoof wall. All four feet are similarly affected. This can be very painful for the animal, which may lead to the necessity of having the horse put down.  HWSD may be confused with white line disease (onychomycosis)

Origin and cause
The disease is an autosomal recessive condition,
which means that both parents of the foal must carry the gene in order for the disease to hit their offspring. The disease is associated with a frameshift mutation in the gene coding for the protein Serpin B11.

Tests and treatment
Genetic predisposition may be confirmed through a DNA test.
There is no treatment as such, owners can attempt to manage the condition though various types of hoof care, and/or the use of special shoes.  Such treatment is expensive and labour-intensive.  Environmental conditions can make the condition worse (alternating wet/dry hooves).  Protecting the hooves from such variations may reduce the effect of the disease.

References

External links
Connemara Pony Research Group.  The CPRG is a group of private individuals concerned about the hoof issue appearing in the Connemara Pony breed.  It was this group that was responsible for initiating the genetic research into HWSD undertaken by the Bannasch Laboratory, U C Davis, California.
More information on the conditions can be downloaded from Pamphlet on HWSD

Horse diseases
Equine hoof